The following lists events that happened during 1993 in Cambodia.

Incumbents 
 Monarch: Chea Sim (until June 14), Norodom Sihanouk (starting June 14)
 Prime Minister: 
 until July 2: Hun Sen 
 starting July 2: Norodom Ranariddh (first Prime Minister)
 starting September 21: Hun Sen (second Prime Minister)

Events

January

February

March

April

May

June

July

August

September

October

November

December

References

 
1990s in Cambodia
Years of the 20th century in Cambodia
Cambodia
Cambodia